132 Aviation Supply Squadron RLC is responsible for aviation supply support to the whole of the Army Aviation community.  The unit is based in Wattisham Airfield.

History
The unit was formed as 132 Aviation Supply Unit and in September 1999 and was subsequently renamed 132 Aviation Supply Squadron.

References

External links
132 Aviation Supply Squadron RLC

Squadrons of the Royal Logistic Corps